The David Cummins Octagon House is an historic octagon house located at 301 Liberty Street in Conneaut, Ohio.  Built sometime in the 1860s, it is named for David Cummins, who founded the Cummins Canning Company in Conneaut. Because the house had a tunnel running from it to the nearby Conneaut Creek, it has been said that the house was a station on the Underground Railroad, but this has been questioned and it has been suggested that the tunnel belonged instead to a previous house located on the property.

On September 9, 1974, it was added to the National Register of Historic Places.

See also
 List of Registered Historic Places in Ashtabula County, Ohio
 List of octagon houses

References

National Register of Historic Places in Ashtabula County, Ohio
Houses on the National Register of Historic Places in Ohio
Houses in Ashtabula County, Ohio
Octagon houses in Ohio
Houses on the Underground Railroad
Conneaut, Ohio